William Mel Togui (born 7 August 1996) is an Ivorian professional footballer who plays as a forward for Israeli side Hapoel Jerusalem on loan from the Belgian club Mechelen.

Club career
On 31 August 2021, he joined RWDM in the Belgian First Division B on loan for the 2021–22 season.

On 18 July 2022, Togui moved on a new loan to Hapoel Jerusalem in Israel.

Career statistics

Club

Notes

International

Honours
Mechelen
 Belgian Cup: 2018–19

References

1996 births
Living people
Ivorian footballers
Ivory Coast international footballers
Association football forwards
Difaâ Hassani El Jadidi players
Ittihad Khemisset players
Rapide Oued Zem players
SC Gagnoa players
K.V. Mechelen players
Espérance Sportive de Tunis players
RWDM47 players
Hapoel Jerusalem F.C. players
Ligue 1 (Ivory Coast) players
Botola players
Belgian Pro League players
Challenger Pro League players
Tunisian Ligue Professionnelle 1 players
Israeli Premier League players
Ivorian expatriate footballers
Expatriate footballers in Morocco
Expatriate footballers in Belgium
Expatriate footballers in Tunisia
Expatriate footballers in Israel
Ivorian expatriate sportspeople in Morocco
Ivorian expatriate sportspeople in Belgium
Ivorian expatriate sportspeople in Tunisia
Ivorian expatriate sportspeople in Israel
Ivory Coast A' international footballers
2018 African Nations Championship players